

 Oak Lake (Nova Scotia) could mean  the following lakes:

Annapolis County 

 Oak Lake (Annapolis County, Nova Scotia) located at

Digby County 

 Oak Lake (Digby County, Nova Scotia) located at

Guysborough County 

 Oak Lake (Guysborough County, Nova Scotia) located at

Halifax Regional Municipality 

 Oak Lake located at

Kings County 
 Oak Lake (Kings County, Nova Scotia) located at

References
Geographical Names Board of Canada
Explore HRM
Nova Scotia Placenames

Lakes of Nova Scotia